Barnham Windmill may refer to:

Barnham Windmill, West Sussex
Barnham Windmill, Suffolk